Expedition of Fadak, also spelt Fidak, took place in December, 627AD, 6AH, 8th month of the Islamic Calendar

Ali ibn Abi Talib was dispatched as the Commander of a platoon to the habitation of Bani Sa‘d bin Bakr in a place called Fadak. Muhammad had received some intelligence that the Banu Bakr had rallied ranks to support the Jews of Khaybar.

The Muslim fighters used to march in the day and lurk at night. On their way, they captured an enemy scout who admitted being sent to Khaibar tribe, to offer them support in return for their dates. ‘Ali and his companions raided their encampment, captured 500 camels and 2000 goats, but the Banu Sa‘d bin Bakr tribe, with their chieftain Wabr bin ‘Aleem had fled away.

See also
Military career of Muhammad
List of expeditions of Muhammad

Notes

628
Campaigns ordered by Muhammad